Institute of Real Estate Management (officially, Institute of Real Estate Management of the National Association of Realtors) is an international community of real estate managers dedicated to ethical business practices, maximizing the value of investment real estate, and promoting superior management through education and information sharing. An affiliate of the National Association of Realtors, the Institute of Real Estate Management (otherwise known as IREM) is the home for all industry professionals connected to real estate management and the only organization serving both the multifamily and commercial sectors.

The Institute of Real Estate Management believes that good management matters and those well-managed properties pay dividends in terms of value and in the quality of life for residents, tenants, and customers. Institute of Real Estate Management believes in professional ethics, the power of knowledge, and the importance of sharing it.

The Institute of Real Estate Management offers a variety of membership types for professionals of every experience level, from on-site managers to high-level executives. IREM credentials, earned by meeting high standards of education, experience, and ethical business practices include: Certified Property Manager (CPM), Accredited Residential Manager (ARM) Accredited Commercial Manager (ACoM), or Accredited Management Organization (AMO).

IREM has been instrumental in providing accurate and continually updated information for real estate managers in real-time to aid in front line responses to COVID-19 and its impact on managed properties. Its Pandemic Guide has been a resource for real estate managers globally.

Since 1933, when it was founded in Chicago, the Institute of Real Estate Management has set the standard for best practices in real estate management. As of April 2020, the Institute of Real Estate Management membership included almost 20,000 individual members and 1,108 corporate members consisting of both AMO headquarter and AMO branch firms.

See also
National Association of Realtors

References

External links
 IREM Official Website

501(c)(6) nonprofit organizations
Real estate industry trade groups
Real estate-related professional associations